Henrique Pereira may refer to:
Henrique M. Pereira (born 1972), Angolan conservation biologist
Henrique Pereira (footballer) (born 2002), Portuguese footballer